Tuber ladder fern is a common name for several plants and may refer to:

Nephrolepis cordifolia, or fishbone fern
Nephrolepis exaltata, or sword fern